Luis Antonio Rodríguez (born March 4, 1985) is an Argentine football defender, currently playing for Swedish club Hammarby. Rodriguez played for Swedish side Djurgårdens IF during the 2010 fall, however the contract was not extended after the 2010 season.

References

External links

BDFA profile 

1985 births
Living people
Sportspeople from Buenos Aires Province
Argentine footballers
Association football forwards
Argentine expatriate footballers
Expatriate footballers in Moldova
Argentine expatriate sportspeople in Moldova
Expatriate men's footballers in Denmark
Argentine expatriate sportspeople in Denmark
Expatriate footballers in Kazakhstan
Argentine expatriate sportspeople in Kazakhstan
Expatriate footballers in Sweden
Argentine expatriate sportspeople in Sweden
Club Atlético Temperley footballers
Djurgårdens IF Fotboll players
FC Sheriff Tiraspol players
AaB Fodbold players
Hammarby Fotboll players
Moldovan Super Liga players
Allsvenskan players
Danish Superliga players
Kazakhstan Premier League players